Team Flexpoint (UCI Code: FLX) was a women's professional cycling team based in Netherlands, sponsored by Flexpoint. The team consisted of two sections: UCI Women's Tour and cyclo-cross.

History

2006

2008

Results 

2005
Hoogerheide Cyclo-cross, Mirjam Melchers-van Poppel
Stage 3 Tour of New Zealand, Susanne Ljungskog 
Ronde van Vlaanderen, Mirjam Melchers-van Poppel 
Stage 3 Gracia-Orlová, Susanne Ljungskog 
Lekkerkerk, Mirjam Melchers-van Poppel 
GP Castilla y León, Susanne Ljungskog 
Flevotour, Vera Koedooder 
Overall Tour de l'Aude Cycliste Féminin, Amber Neben 
Stage 3b, Amber Neben 
Stage 1Eko Tour Dookola Polski, Tanja Schmidt-Hennes 
Emakumen Saria, Mirjam Melchers-van Poppel 
Stage 2 Emakumeen Euskal Bira, Susanne Ljungskog 
Overall RaboSter Zeeuwsche Eilanden, Mirjam Melchers-van Poppel 
Stage 3, Mirjam Melchers-van Poppel 
Stage 5 Giro d'Italia Donne, Mirjam Melchers-van Poppel 
Waasmunster, Sandra Rombouts 
Boxmeer, Mirjam Melchers-van Poppel 
Alblasserdam, Linda Melanie Villumsen 
Roosendaal, Mirjam Melchers-van Poppel 
Oostvoorne, Mirjam Melchers-van Poppel 
Skara, Susanne Ljungskog 
Stage 4b (TTT), Tanja Schmidt-Hennes, Luise Keller, Sandra Rombouts, Susanne Ljungskog, Mirjam Melchers-van Poppel, Linda Melanie Villumsen 
Overall Holland Ladies Tour, Tanja Schmidt-Hennes 
Stage 6, Susanne Ljungskog 
Overall Giro della Toscana Int. Femminile, Susanne Ljungskog 
Prologue, Mirjam Melchers-van Poppel 
Stage 4, Susanne Ljungskog 
Amersfoort, Cyclo-cross, Mirjam Melchers-van Poppel 
2006
Overall Redlands Bicycle Classic, Amber Neben 
Stages 1 & 3, Amber Neben 
Oploo, Vera Koedooder 
Ronde van Vlaanderen, Mirjam Melchers-van Poppel 
Veldhoven, Linda Melanie Villumsen 
Overall Tour de l'Aude Cycliste Féminin, Amber Neben
Stage 1 (TTT), Amber Neben, Madeleine Sandig, Mirjam Melchers-van Poppel, Loes Gunnewijk, Sandra Rombouts, Susanne Ljungskog 
Stage 3, Loes Gunnewijk 
Stage 9, Susanne Ljungskog 
Rijsoord, Vera Koedooder  
Emakumen Saria, Susanne Ljungskog 
Stage 3b Emakumeen Euskal Bira, Susanne Ljungskog 
Arnhem, Sandra Rombouts 
Stage 1 RaboSter Zeeuwsche Eilanden, Linda Melanie Villumsen 
Kaatsheuvel, Vera Koedooder 
Stage 7 Giro d'Italia Donne, Susanne Ljungskog 
Arendonk, Sandra Rombouts 
Vårgårda, Susanne Ljungskog 
Overall Route de France Féminine, Linda Melanie Villumsen
Stage 4b (TTT) Loes Gunnewijk, Linda Melanie Villumsen,  Amber Neben, Susanne Ljungskog  
Brasschaat, Vera Koedooder 
Overall Holland Ladies Tour, Susanne Ljungskog 
Stage 2 Euregio Ladies Tour, Loes Gunnewijk 
Dordrecht, Cyclo-cross, Loes Gunnewijk 
Sydney, Scratch race, Vera Koedooder 
Vorden, Cyclo-cross, Loes Gunnewijk 
2007
Oud-Vossemeer, Iris Slappendel 
Omloop Het Nieuwsblad, Mie Bekker Lacota 
Overall Redlands Bicycle Classic, Amber Neben 
Prologue, Amber Neben 
Svendborg, Mie Bekker Lacota 
Stage 4 Gracia-Orlová, Trine Schmidt 
Stage 5 Gracia-Orlová, Loes Markerink 
Heerenveen, Derny, Loes Markerink 
Overall Tour de l'Aude Cycliste Féminin, Susanne Ljungskog 
CH-Transport Løbet/CK Fix, Trine Schmidt 
Sjællandsmesterskab ITT, Trine Schmidt 
Stage 1 Emakumeen Euskal Bira (TTT), Loes Gunnewijk, Susanne Ljungskog, Mirjam Melchers-van Poppel, Susanne Ljungskog 
Oosterbeek, Mirjam Melchers-van Poppel 
Stage 6  Thüringen-Rundfahrt der Frauen, Susanne Ljungskog 
Maastricht, Omnium (F):  Mirjam Melchers-van Poppel 
General classification Route de France Féminine, Amber Neben
Stage 4b, Amber Neben 
Pijnacker, Mirjam Melchers-van Poppel  
Sorø, Trine Schmidt 
Vejen, Trine Schmidt 
Chrono des Herbiers, Susanne Ljungskog 
Amersfoort, Cyclo-cross, Mirjam Melchers-van Poppel 
2008
Surhuisterveen, Cyclo-cross, Saskia Elemans 
Wieze, Loes Markerink 
Roeselare, Loes Markerink 
Veldhoven, Iris Slappendel 
Districtskampioenschap Oost-Nederland, Loes Markerink 
Stage 2 Tour de l'Aude Cycliste Féminin, Loes Gunnewijk, Mirjam Melchers-van Poppel 
Stage 6 Vuelta Ciclista Femenina a el Salvador, Anita Valen de Vries 
7-Dorpenomloop Aalburg, Loes Markerink 
Stage 2a Grande Boucle Féminine Internationale, Loes Markerink 
La Mirada, Amber Neben 
Prologue Giro d'Italia Donne, Mirjam Melchers-van Poppel 
Ochten, Iris Slappendel 
Alblasserdam, Loes Markerink 
Barendrecht, Iris Slappendel 
Emmen, Loes Gunnewijk 
Stage 5 Holland Ladies Tour, Loes Markerink 
Hilversum, Suzanne van Veen 
Overall Tour de l'Ardèche, Amber Neben
Stage 6, Susanne Ljungskog 
Harderwijk, Cyclo-cross, Saskia Elemans 
Nieuwkuijk, Cyclo-cross, Saskia Elemans 
Chrono des Herbiers, Susanne Ljungskog 
Moergestel, Cyclo-cross, Saskia Elemans 
Amersfoort, Cyclo-cross, Mirjam Melchers-van Poppel 
Vorden, Cyclo-cross, Loes Gunnewijk 
2009
Sint Michielsgestel, Cyclo-cross, Mirjam Melchers-van Poppel 
Surhuisterveen, Cyclo-cross, Saskia Elemans 
Oud-Vossemeer, Iris Slappendel 
Luttenberg, Loes Gunnewijk 
Districtskampioenschap Oost-Nederland, Loes Gunnewijk 
1stStage 5 Gran Caracol de Pista, Trine Schmidt

National, continental and world champions

2005
 Sweden National Road Race Championship, Susanne Ljungskog
2006
 World Universiade Time Trial Championship, Loes Gunnewijk
 Pan American Time Trial Championships, Amber Neben
 National Time Trial Championship, Loes Gunnewijk
 Denmark National Time Trial Championship, Linda Melanie Villumsen
 Sweden National Time Trial Championship, Susanne Ljungskog
 Sweden National Road Race Championship, Susanne Ljungskog
 Denmark National Road Race Championship, Linda Melanie Villumsen
 National Road Race Championship, Annette Beutler
 European U23 Time Trial Championship, Linda Melanie Villumsen
 National Track Championship (Points), Madeleine Sandig
 National Mountainbike Championship (Marathon), Elsbeth Van Rooy-Vink
 National Track Championship (Individual Pursuit), Vera Koedooder
2007
 Denmark National Time Trial Championship, Trine Schmidt
 National Road Race Championship, Luise Keller
 Denmark National Track Championship (Scratch), Trine Schmidt
 Denmark National Track Championship (Individual Pursuit), Trine Schmidt
 Denmark National Track Championship (Individual Sprint), Mie Bekker Lacota
2008
 National Cyclo-cross Championship, Mirjam Melchers-van Poppel
 World Universiade Time Trial Championship, Iris Slappendel
 World Universiade Road Race Championship, Elise Van Hage
 National Time Trial Championship, Anita Valen de Vries
 National Road Race Championship, Anita Valen de Vries
 National Time Trial Championship, Mirjam Melchers-van Poppel
 World Time Trial Championship, Amber Neben
2009
 National Cyclo-cross Championship (Juniors), Tessa van Nieuwpoort
 Denmark National Track Championship (Individual Pursuit), Trine Schmidt

Team roster 2007

Team roster UCI Women's Team 2007 

 Mirjam Melchers (Ned)
 Susanne Ljungskog (Swe)
 Amber Neben (USA)
 Loes Gunnewijk (Ned)
 Mie Lacota (Den)
 Luise Keller (Ger)
 Moniek Kleinsman (Ned)
 Loes Markerink (Ned)
 Madeleine Sandig (Ger)
 Trine Schmidt (Den)
 Iris Slappendel (Ned)
 Susanne van Veen (Ned)

Team roster Cyclo-Cross Team 2007/2008 
 Britt Jochems (Ned)
 Loes Gunnewijk (Ned)
 Loes Markerink (Ned)
 Mirjam Melchers (Ned)
 Tessa van Nieuwpoort (Ned)

Management 
Jean-Paul van Poppel, Klas Johansson, Geert Broekhuizen

External links
 Team Flexpoint
 Team Flexpoint on CQ Ranking
 Flexpoint on CycleBase

 
Cycling teams based in the Netherlands
Cycling teams established in 2005
UCI Women's Teams